is a railway station on the Nippō Main Line operated by JR Kyushu in Saiki, Ōita, Japan.

Lines

Layout 
The station has a side platform and an island platform serving three tracks at grade. Multiple sidings run to the south of platform 3. The station building is a modern two-storey concrete structure which houses a waiting area, kiosks and a staffed ticket window with a Midori no Madoguchi facility. Access to the island platform is by means of a footbridge.

Adjacent stations

History
The Kyushu Railway was nationalised on 1 July 1907. Japanese Government Railways (JGR), designated the track as the Hōshū Main Line on 12 October 1909 and expanded it southwards in phases, with Saiki opening as the new southern terminus on 25 October 1916. It became a through-station on 20 November 1920 when the track was extended further south to Gōnohara (today ). On 15 December 1923, the Hōshū Main Line was renamed the Nippō Main Line. On 15 January 1962, the reading of the station name was changed from "Saeki" to "Saiki" with no change to the kanji characters. With the privatization of Japanese National Railways (JNR), the successor of JGR, on 1 April 1987, the station came under the control of JR Kyushu.

On 17 September 2017, Typhoon Talim (Typhoon 18) damaged the Nippō Main Line at several locations. Rail services were restored on 18 December 2017. Of the two tracks there, only one would be restored. According to JR Kyushu, having only a single track there (effectively closing down the signal box) would not have a large impact on its timetables and believed that it amounted to a full restoration of service.

Passenger statistics
In fiscal 2016, the station was used by an average of 805 passengers daily (boarding passengers only), and it ranked 191st among the busiest stations of JR Kyushu.

See also
List of railway stations in Japan

References

External links 

Saiki (JR Kyushu)

Railway stations in Ōita Prefecture
Railway stations in Japan opened in 1916